The O2 Centre is an indoor shopping and entertainment centre that is open for around 18 hours per day located on Finchley Road in North West London, near Hampstead. England.

It is now owned by Landsec, previously X Leisure, and opened in 1998. Despite the same name and originally very similar logo, it is no relation to the O2 telecommunications brand, which was launched 4 years later. The name was chosen as reference to the spacious feel of the building, as O2 is the chemical formula for dioxygen.

With anchor units of Sainsbury's on level 0, Virgin Active (previously Esporta) on Level 1 and VUE cinema on Level 2, the centre is a unique mix of retail, entertainment and leisure – reflected in the centre's 18 hour+ opening times. It also has two gyms and a large car park.

History

Development 

The opening of the centre in 1998 came after many years of the site remaining derelict. In the early 1990s the buildings along Finchley Road were demolished in preparation for the centre, but problems with planning permission, with concerns over traffic in particular, led to construction being delayed by many years. A great deal of consultation took place with local residents, including asking them to vote from a choice of 3 designs for the exterior of the building, relating to different kinds of periodic elements – and asking them to suggest a name.

Original plans included having a bowling alley in the location eventually occupied by Esporta, Sainsbury's being in the warehouse-style building occupied by Homebase, and the lower ground level (now Sainsburys) being home to several non-food retailers such as Waterstones.

The original £15m budget for the build was exceeded in early 1997, causing a temporary delay in the build until additional capital investors could be found.

Other places 
The shops has Sainsbury's, Aldi, Vue Cinema, Virgin Active, Waterstones, Homebase, IMO Car Wash, The Little Gym and 3 Amazon Lockers. Restaurants include Wagamamma, Nando, Zero Zero, and Starbucks. The retail, gym, entertainment and restaurants are reflected in 18+ hour opening times for the centre which are as follows

Mon to Thurs: 6am-12:30am
Fri and Sat: 6am-1am
Sun: 7am-12:15am

Proposed closure 
In November 2020, following a year of losses for Landsec due to the COVID-19 pandemic in the United Kingdom, it announced it intended to sell over £4bn of assets in the next four to five years. In December 2020, Landsec and Camden Council announced they would be closing the O2 Centre, which would be demolished and new housing would be built, with a limited amount of retail included.

Other developments
Since taking over the O2 Centre, Land Securities has been redeveloping the site to improve the offering.{reference required)

Transport 
The closest tube station is Finchley Road, 100 yards south, served by the Jubilee and Metropolitan lines. Finchley Road and Frognal station served by the London Overground is a short walk away and West Hampstead railway stations are also in close proximity, accessed by walking along B510 West End Lane, to Blackburn Road to connect to a pedestrian and cycle path to the car park, next to the Homebase.

There are several bus and coach routes that stop right outside the O2 centre including 13, 113, 187 and 268. Also close by on West End Lane are C11, 31, 46, 139, 328 and 603 bus stops. Local night buses are N113.

The redevelopment plans include a proposal to add a new entrance from the site to the Finchley Road Stube station, potentially including making the station fully accessible.

References

External links 
 

Shopping centres in the London Borough of Camden
Swiss Cottage
Shopping malls established in 1998
1998 establishments in England